Tomasz Bednarek and David Pel were the defending champions but chose not to defend their title.

Julian Ocleppo and Andrea Vavassori won the title after defeating Gonzalo Escobar and Fernando Romboli 4–6, 6–1, [11–9] in the final.

Seeds

Draw

References
 Main Draw

Aspria Tennis Cup - Doubles
2018 Doubles